Gisha is an Israeli human rights organization, founded in 2005, whose goal is to protect the freedom of movement of Palestinians, especially Gaza residents. Gisha promotes rights guaranteed by international and Israeli law. It uses legal assistance and public advocacy to protect the rights of Palestinian residents.

It represents individuals and organizations in Israeli administrative proceedings and courts. Gisha means both “access” and “approach”. Gisha is registered in Israel as an independent, non-partisan, not-for-profit organization.

Example of projects
Israel restricts movement of Palestinian residents between the West Bank and Gaza. Israel has implemented a policy of allowing Palestinian movement from the West Bank to Gaza, but making it quite difficult for Gaza residents to move to the West Bank. Israel typically refuses to allow Gaza residents to leave for the West Bank, even when the Gaza resident is originally a West Bank resident. Gisha has helped Gaza residents who had moved from the West Bank to Gaza return to the West Bank by filing petitions to Israeli authorities arguing that extremely pressing personal circumstances provide humanitarian grounds for relief.

See also
Human rights in Israel
Hamoked
Alternative information center
Bustan

References

Human rights organizations based in Israel
Non-governmental organizations involved in the Israeli–Palestinian conflict